Palari may refer to:

Palari (boat), a traditional Indonesian boat
Palari (tribe), a Khyber Pakhtun (Pathan) tribe in Pakistan
Palari, Madhya Pradesh, a village in India
Polari or palari, a form of cant slang